Ozark Acres is an unincorporated community, census-designated place (CDP), Suburban Improvement District (SID), and a Deeded Community in Sharp County, Arkansas, United States. It was first listed as a CDP in the 2020 census with a population of 692.

Geography
Ozark Acres is located at  (36.30717, -91.38747).

One of the most notable geographic features of Ozark Acres is the abundance of hills, lakes, and rivers. In fact, one of the most popular places in Ozark Acres is Lake Vagabond, which is a private man-made lake / beach. Open usually from May to early Autumn, Lake Vagabond is used both for fishing and swimming.

The second lake, Spring Lake, is much smaller and fed by a natural spring, as the name suggests. While it has no beaches for swimming, it is also a private lake and open year round.

Demographics

2020 census

Note: the US Census treats Hispanic/Latino as an ethnic category. This table excludes Latinos from the racial categories and assigns them to a separate category. Hispanics/Latinos can be of any race.

References

Unincorporated communities in Sharp County, Arkansas
Unincorporated communities in Arkansas
Census-designated places in Arkansas